Myoleja contemnens is a species of tephritid or fruit flies in the genus Myoleja of the family Tephritidae.

References

contemnens